Speed of Life may refer to:

 "Speed of Life" (David Bowie song), an instrumental from David Bowie's 1977 album Low
 Speed of Life (Nitty Gritty Dirt Band album), 2009
 Speed of Life (Adam Brand album), 2020
 Speed of Life, a 2012 album by The Christians
 Speed of Life (Dirty South album), 2013
 Speed of Life (TV series) a 2016 television drama produced by TVB